Scirpophaga fusciflua is a moth in the family Crambidae. It was described by George Hampson in 1893. It is found in Taiwan, Afghanistan, India, Nepal, Thailand and Sri Lanka.

The wingspan is 16–22 mm for males and 21–27 mm for females. The forewings of the males are white to pale ochreous white and the hindwings are white. Females have white forewings and hindwings.

The larvae feed on Oryza sativa.

References

Moths described in 1893
Schoenobiinae
Moths of Asia